Nikolai (Edze Dochak' in Upper Kuskokwim) is a city in Yukon-Koyukuk Census Area, Alaska, United States.  The population was 94 as of the 2010 census, down from 100 in 2000.

Geography
Nikolai is located at  (63.010838, -154.383895).

Demographics

Nikolai first appeared on the 1950 U.S. Census as an unincorporated village. It formally incorporated in 1970.

As of the census of 2000, there were 100 people, 40 households, and 23 families residing in the city. The population density was 22.1 people per square mile (8.5/km2). There were 47 housing units at an average density of 10.4 per square mile (4.0/km2). The racial makeup of the city was 19% White and 81% Native American.

There were 40 households, out of which 27.5% had children under the age of 18 living with them, 37.5% were married couples living together, 7.5% had a female householder with no husband present, and 42.5% were non-families. 42.5% of all households were made up of individuals, and 7.5% had someone living alone who was 65 years of age or older. The average household size was 2.50 and the average family size was 3.35.

In the city, the age distribution of the population shows 27.0% under the age of 18, 6.0% from 18 to 24, 24.0% from 25 to 44, 26.0% from 45 to 64, and 17.0% who were 65 years of age or older. The median age was 40 years. For every 100 females, there were 194.1 males. For every 100 females age 18 and over, there were 160.7 males.

The median income for a household in the city was $15,000, and the median income for a family was $15,417.  The per capita income for the city was $11,029. There were 21.1% of families and 27.6% of the population living below the poverty line, including 22.2% of under eighteens and 15.8% of those over 64.

Education
The Iditarod Area School District operates the Top of the Kuskokwim School in Nikolai.

References

External links
 
  - Revised January 2004
 Student film on Nikolai

Cities in Alaska
Cities in Yukon–Koyukuk Census Area, Alaska